The 2020 Viterra Championship, Manitoba's provincial men's curling championship, was held from February 5 to 9 at the Eric Coy Arena in Winnipeg. The winning Jason Gunnlaugson rink represented Manitoba at the 2020 Tim Hortons Brier and finished with a 5–6 record.

Jason Gunnlaugson won his first Viterra Championship by defeating Mike McEwen 7–4 in the final.

Teams
Teams are as follows:

Knockout brackets
The scores are as follows:

32 team double knockout with playoff round
Four teams qualify each from A Event and B Event

A event

B event

Knockout results
All draws are listed in Central Time (UTC−06:00).

Draw 1
Wednesday, February 5, 8:30 am

Draw 2
Wednesday, February 5, 12:15 pm

Draw 3
Wednesday, February 5, 4:00 pm

Draw 4
Wednesday, February 5, 8:15 pm

Draw 5
Thursday, February 6, 8:30 am

Draw 6
Thursday, February 6, 12:15 pm

Draw 7
Thursday, February 6, 4:00 pm

Draw 8
Thursday, February 6, 7:45 pm

Draw 9
Friday, February 7, 8:30 am

Draw 10
Friday, February 7, 12:15 pm

Draw 11
Friday, February 7, 4:00 pm

Playoff round
8 team double knockout
Four teams qualify into Championship Round

A bracket

Draw 12
Friday, February 7, 7:45 pm

Draw 13
Saturday, February 8, 9:00 am

B bracket

Draw 13
Saturday, February 8, 9:00 am

Draw 14
Saturday, February 8, 2:00 pm

Championship Round

1 vs. 2
Saturday, February 8, 6:00 pm

3 vs. 4
Saturday, February 8, 6:00 pm

Semifinal
Sunday, February 9, 8:30 am

Final
Sunday, February 9, 2:30 pm

References

External links
Official site

2020 Tim Hortons Brier
Curling competitions in Winnipeg
2020 in Manitoba
Viterra Championship
2020s in Winnipeg